Genesis Llasos Servania (born August 15, 1991) is a Filipino professional boxer who challenged for the WBO featherweight title in 2017.

Early life
As with many other boxers from the Philippines, Servania came from a poor family before arising into fame. His father was convicted in a crime earlier, and couldn't get a job. In return, his mother went out to sell fishes to provide the needs of their family. Eventually, Servania dropped out of school at the age of 15, and became a tricycle driver.

To earn more for living, Servania started joining local tournaments as an amateur boxer, and won few fights before turning pro. He was then introduced to Antonio L. Aldeguer of ALA Promotions.

Professional career
Servania made his professional debut on February 21, 2009, at the age of 17, defeating Mike Espanosa via KO at the second round at 
PAGCOR Hotel and Casino, Goldenfield Commercial Complex, Bacolod City, Philippines.

On June 2, 2012, the then 20-year Servania, won the vacant  WBC International Silver Super Bantamweight title via TKO, knocking-down a more experienced Mexican boxer Genaro 'Pablonito' García at the 12th round.

On his next fight held on August 18, 2012, Servania captured another belt, the vacant WBO Asia Pacific Super Bantamweight title against Jorge Pazos of Mexico via unanimous decision.

On October 26, 2013, during the Pinoy Pride XXII, Servania won the vacant WBO Inter-Continental Super Bantamweight title after knocking-out Panama's Rafael Concepción at the 2nd round.

During the Pinoy Pride XXVII held at Dubai World Trade Centre, Dubai, United Arab Emirates on September 5, 2014, Servania stopped the Mexican Jose 'Matador' Cabrera at the 10th round, and retained his WBO Intercontinental Super Bantamweight title.

On April 29, 2017, Genesis Servania stops Ralph Jhon Lulu in two rounds to claim the vacant WBO Asia Pacific Featherweight title in Japan.

Professional boxing record

Regional and Minor Titles
WBO Asia Pacific Featherweight Title (April 2017)
WBO Inter-Continental Super Bantamweight Title (October 2013)
WBO Asia Pacific Super Bantamweight Title (August 2012)
WBC International Silver Super Bantamweight Title (June 2012)

See also
List of Filipino boxing world champions
List of WBO world champions
List of super-bantamweight boxing champions
2014 in Philippine sports
2015 in Philippine sports
List of Philippine television specials aired in 2014

References

External links 
 

1991 births
Living people
Bantamweight boxers
Sportspeople from Bacolod
Filipino male boxers
Boxers from Negros Occidental